The population of Afghanistan is around 40 million as of 2021. The nation is composed of a multi-ethnic and multilingual society, reflecting its location astride historic trade and invasion routes between Central Asia, South Asia, and Western Asia. Ethnic groups in the country include Pashtun, Tajik, Hazara, Uzbeks, Nuristanis, Aimaq, Turkmen, Baloch and some others which are less known. Together they make up the contemporary Afghan people.

Approximately 46% of the population is under 15 years of age, and 74% of all Afghans live in rural areas. The average woman gives birth to five children during her entire life, the highest fertility rate outside of Africa. About 6.8% of all babies die in child-birth or infancy. The average life expectancy of the nation was reported in 2019 at around 63 years, and only 0.04% of the population has HIV.

Persian(Dari) and Pashto are both the official languages of the country. Dari functions as the inter-ethnic lingua franca for the vast majority. Pashto is widely used in the regions south of the Hindu Kush mountains and as far as the Indus River in neighbouring Pakistan. Uzbek and Turkmen are smaller languages spoken in parts of the north. Multilingualism is common throughout the country, especially in the major cities.

Up to 89.7% of the population practices Sunni Islam and belongs to the Hanafi Islamic law school, while 10–15% are followers of Shia Islam; the majority of whom belong to the Twelver branch, with smaller numbers of Ismailis. The remaining 0.3% practice other religions such as Sikhism and Hinduism. Excluding urban populations in the principal cities, most people are organised into tribal and other kinship-based groups, who follow their own traditional customs.

Population statistics 

Anatol Lieven of Georgetown University in Qatar wrote in 2021 that "it may be noted that in the whole of modern Afghan history there has never been a census that could be regarded as remotely reliable."

Historical 

The first nationwide census of Afghanistan was carried out only in 1979, but previously there had been scattered attempts to conduct censuses in individual cities. According to the 1876 census, Kabul had a population of 140,700 people. In Kandahar in 1891 a population census was carried out, according to which 31,514 people lived in the city, of which 16,064 were men and 15,450 were women.

In 1979 the total population was reported to be about 15.5 million. From 1979 until the end of 1983, some 5 million people left the country to take shelter in neighbouring northwestern Pakistan and eastern Iran. This exodus was largely unchecked by any government. The Afghan government in 1983 reported a population of 15.96 million, which presumably included the exodus.

It is assumed that roughly 600,000 to as high as 2 million Afghans may have been killed during the various 1979–2001 wars. These figures are questionable and no attempt has ever been made to verify if they were actually killed or had moved to neighbouring countries as refugees.

Current and latest

As of 2021, the total population of Afghanistan is around 37,466,414, which includes the 3 million Afghan nationals living in both Pakistan and Iran. About 26% of the population is urbanite and the remaining 74% lives in rural areas.

Afghanistan's Central Statistics Organization (CSO) stated in 2011 that the total number of Afghans living inside Afghanistan was about 26 million and by 2017 it reached 29.2 million. Of this, 15 million are males and 14.2 million are females. The country's population is expected to reach 82 million by 2050.

Urban areas have experienced rapid population growth in the last decade, which is due to the return of over 5 million expats. The only city in Afghanistan with over a million residents is its capital, Kabul.

Age structure

0–14 years: 40.62% (male 7,562,703/female 7,321,646)
15-24 years: 21.26% (male 3,960,044/female 3,828,670)
25-54 years: 31.44% (male 5,858,675/female 5,661,887)
55-64 years: 4.01% (male 724,597/female 744,910)
65 years and over: 2.68% (male 451,852/female 528,831) (2020 est.)

Population growth rate
2.34% (2021)
country comparison to the world: 39

Urbanization

urbanisation population: 26% of the total population (2020)
rate of urbanisation: 3.37% annual rate of change (2015–20)

Sex ratio
at birth: 1.05 male(s)/female
0-14 years: 1.03 male(s)/female
15-24 years: 1.03 male(s)/female
25-54 years: 1.03 male(s)/female
55-64 years: 0.97 male(s)/female
65 years and over: 0.85 male(s)/female
total population: 1.05 male(s)/female (2020)

Vital statistics

UN estimates

Fertility and births
Total Fertility Rate (TFR) (Wanted Fertility Rate) and Crude Birth Rate (CBR):

Fertility data by province (DHS Program):

Structure of the population 

Structure of the population (2012.01.07) (Data refer to the settled population based on the 1979 Population Census and the latest household prelisting. The refugees of Afghanistan in Iran, Pakistan, and an estimated 1.5 million nomads, are not included):

Population Estimates by Sex and Age Group 2012:

Population Estimates by Sex and Age Group (01.VII.2020):

Life expectancy 
total population:
63.2 years (2019)country comparison to the world: 214
male: 63.3 years (2019)
female: 63.2 years (2019)

Source: UN World Population Prospects

Development and health indicators

Literacy 
Definition: People over the age of 15 that can read and write
Total population:  43% (2018)
Male: 55.5%
Female: 29.8%

School life expectancy (primary to tertiary education)
total: 10 years
male: 13 years
female: 8 years (2018)

HIV/AIDS – adult prevalence rate
0.04% (2015)

HIV/AIDS – people living with HIV/AIDS
Up to 6,900 (2015 estimate)

In 2008, health officials in Afghanistan reported 504 cases of people living with HIV but by the end of 2012 the numbers reached 1,327. The nation's health ministry stated that most of the HIV patients were among intravenous drug users and that 70% of them were men, 25% women, and the remaining 5% children. They belonged to Kabul, Kandahar and Herat, the provinces from where people make the most trips to neighbouring and foreign countries. Regarding Kandahar, 22 cases were reported in 2012. "AIDS Prevention department head Dr Hamayoun Rehman said 1,320 blood samples were examined and 21 were positive. Among the 21 patients, 18 were males and three were females who contracted the deadly virus from their husbands. He said four people had reached a critical stage while three had died. The main source of the disease was the use of syringes used by drug addicts." There are approximately 23,000 addicts in the country who inject drugs into their bodies using syringescountry comparison to the world: 168

HIV/AIDS – deaths
Up to 300 (2015 estimate)

Major infectious diseases
 Food  or waterborne diseases:  bacterial and protozoal diarrhoea, hepatitis A, and typhoid fever
 Vector-borne diseases:  malaria
 Animal  contact diseases:  rabies

Note: WH5N1  avian influenza has been identified in this country; it poses a negligible risk as of 2009.

Ethnic groups

In recent years, a nationwide distribution of Afghan e-ID cards (e-Tazkiras) began. The ethnicity of each citizen is provided in the application. This process is expected to reveal the exact figures about the size and composition of the country's ethnic groups. Article Four of the Afghan Constitution mentions 14 ethnic groups by names but some Afghans belong to other such groups. An approximate distribution of the ethnolinguistic groups are listed in the chart below:

The recent estimate in the above chart is somewhat supported by the below national opinion polls, which were aimed at knowing how a group of about 804 to 8,706 local residents in Afghanistan felt about the current war, political situation, as well as the economic and social issues affecting their daily lives. Ten surveys were conducted between 2004 and 2015 by the Asia Foundation (a sample is shown in the table below; the survey in 2015 did not contain information on the ethnicity of the participants) and one between 2004 and 2009 by a combined effort of the broadcasting companies NBC News, BBC, and ARD.

Languages
Dari and Pashto are both the official languages of Afghanistan.

Uzbek and Turkmen are spoken as native languages in northern provinces, mainly among the Uzbeks and Turkmens. Smaller number of Afghans are also fluent in English, Urdu, Balochi, Arabic and other languages. An approximate distribution of languages spoken in the country is shown in the chart below:

Based on information from the latest national opinion polls, up to 51% stated that they can speak or understand Pashto and up to 79% stated that they can speak or understand Dari. Uzbek was spoken or understood by up to 11% and Turkmen by up to 7%. Other languages that can be spoken are Arabic (4%) and Balochi (2%).

Religion 

Almost the entire Afghan population is Muslim, with less than 1% being non-Muslim. Despite attempts to secularise Afghan society, Islamic practices pervade all aspects of life. Likewise, Islamic religious tradition and codes, together with traditional practices, provide the principal means of controlling personal conduct and settling legal disputes. Islam was used as the main basis for expressing opposition to the modernisation of Afghanistan by King Amanullah in the 1920s. It was also used by the mujahideen during the 1980s Soviet–Afghan War and by the Taliban today.

The members of Sikh and Hindu communities are mostly concentrated in urban areas. They numbered hundreds of thousands in the 1970s but over 90% have since fled due to the Afghan wars and persecution.
Islam: 100% of the total population
Sunni Muslim: 84.7–89.7%
Shia Muslim: 7-15%
others: 0.00001%
Baha'is 0
Sikhism: 43
Hinduism: 0
Zoroastrianism: 0
Christianity: 0
Judaism: 0
Buddhism: 0

See also

 Culture of Afghanistan
 Turks in Afghanistan
 Tajiks in Afghanistan
 Afghan Turkmens
 Afghan Kurds

References

Further reading
 Banting, Erinn. Afghanistan the People. Crabtree Publishing Company, 2003. .
 Caroe, Olaf (1958). The Pathans: 500 B.C.-A.D. 1957. Oxford in Asia Historical Reprints. Oxford University Press, 1983. .
 Dupree, Nancy Hatch. An Historical Guide to Afghanistan. 2nd Edition. Revised and Enlarged. Afghan Air Authority, Afghan Tourist Organization, 1977.
 Elphinstone, Mountstuart. 1819. An account of the kingdom of Caubul, and its dependencies in Persia, Tartary, and India: Comprising a view of the Afghaun nation, and a history of the Dooraunee monarchy. Printed for Longman, Hurst, Rees, Orme, and Brown, and J. Murry, 1819.
 Habibi, Abdul Hai. 2003. "Afghanistan: An Abridged History." Fenestra Books. .
 Hopkins, B. D. 2008. The Making of Modern Afghanistan. Palgrave Macmillan, 2008. .
 Reddy, L. R. Inside Afghanistan: end of the Taliban era?. APH Publishing, 2002. .
 Amy Romano. A Historical Atlas of Afghanistan. The Rosen Publishing Group, 2003. .
 Vogelsang, Willem. The Afghans. Wiley-Blackwell, 2002. Oxford, UK & Massachusettes, USA. .

External links 

National Statistic and Information Authority (NSIA) 
Afghanistan - USAID
Afghanistan – Naval Postgraduate School
Afghan refugees in Pakistan - UNHCR